Ştefan Kurecska (born 31 July 1933) is a Romanian rower. He competed in two events at the 1960 Summer Olympics.

References

External links 
 

1933 births
Living people
Romanian male rowers
Olympic rowers of Romania
Rowers at the 1960 Summer Olympics
Sportspeople from Arad, Romania